IGT may refer to:

Biology and medicine
Impaired glucose tolerance, a term associated with diabetes
Insufficient Glandular Tissue, a term associated with low milk supply in breastfeeding
 Information Governance Toolkit, an online system used in the NHS in the United Kingdom
 Image Guided Therapy, a research area about navigated medical interventions (also see Computer-assisted interventions)

Technology

 International Game Technology, a gaming systems manufacturer
 International Game Technology (1975–2015), the original company superseded by merging with Gtech
 Integrated Telecom Technology, or IgT, a former semiconductor company

Culture

 Ireland's Got Talent, an Irish version of the Got Talent series
 Indonesia's Got Talent, an Indonesian version of the Got Talent series
 India's Got Talent, an Indian version of the Got Talent series

Other

 Interlinear Glossed Text, a structured representation language text in various forms (usually for multilingual translations)
 Indicazione Geografica Tipica, a class of Italian wine appellation ranking below Denominazione di Origine Controllata but above Vino da Tavola
 Iowa gambling task, a psychological task thought to simulate real-life decision making
Magas Airport, IATA code IGT, is an airport in the Russian Republic of Ingushetia. 

pt:IGT